Jean Fredman (born Johan Fredrik Fredman; 1712 or 1713 – 9 May 1767) was a famous figure in 18th century Stockholm. He was the son of the watchmaker Andreas Fredman from his first marriage. He later also became a watchmaker, after being his father's apprentice. In the year 1745 he married a wealthy widow named Katarina Lindberg. Between the husband and wife there took place a buzzed-about legal process as Fredman had embezzled his wife's money.

In 1752, things started to go worse for Fredman as his wife died. This signalled the start of numerous events that would leave him poor and on the streets before his death on 6 May 1767.

Jean Fredman is the key figure in Carl Michael Bellman's works from the 18th century, the Songs of Fredman and the Epistles of Fredman. Bellman let Fredman be the supposed narrator of his songs and poems. Originally it was thought that Fredman would play a part similar to the one of the apostle Paul in the Bible, writing epistles to his "congregation". The first song about Fredman was about his funeral, and would later become number 26 in Songs of Fredman.

References

Sources

External links

 Fredman's Epistles (Swedish texts)

People from Stockholm
1710s births
1767 deaths
Year of birth uncertain
18th-century Swedish people
Carl Michael Bellman
Gustavian era people